The Precinct is a 2010 Azerbaijani drama film directed by Ilgar Safat. The film was selected as the Azerbaijani entry for the Best Foreign Language Film at the 83rd Academy Awards, but it did not make the final shortlist.

For his performance in an International Feature Film, Teymur Odushev won the award of Young Artist Awards 2011.

Cast
 Zaza Bejashvili as Garib
 Teymur Odushev as young Garib
 Melissa Papel as Sabina
 Vagif Ibrahimoglu as Police chief

See also
 List of submissions to the 83rd Academy Awards for Best Foreign Language Film
 List of Azerbaijani submissions for the Academy Award for Best Foreign Language Film

References

External links

2010 films
Azerbaijani drama films
Azerbaijani-language films
2010s Russian-language films
Films directed by Ilgar Safat
2010 drama films
2010 multilingual films
Azerbaijani multilingual films